The white-lipped tamarin (Saguinus labiatus), also known as the red-bellied tamarin, is a tamarin which lives in the Amazon area of Brazil and  Bolivia.

The red belly of these New World monkeys is its most remarkable outward characteristic. Otherwise it is black with a thin white mustache on its face and a black-brown back.

They live in social groups of related animals. The mother usually gives birth to one or two young at a time. The father carries the babies most, but siblings (brothers and sisters) will also share the carrying of youngsters, and so learn how to be good carers.

There are three subspecies:
 Saguinus labiatus labiatus
 Saguinus labiatus rufiventer
 Thomas' moustached tamarin, Saguinus labiatus thomasi

References

white-lipped tamarin
Mammals of Brazil
Mammals of Bolivia
white-lipped tamarin
Taxa named by Étienne Geoffroy Saint-Hilaire